
When heated, ammonium nitrate decomposes non-explosively into gases of oxygen, nitrogen, and water vapor; however, it can be induced to decompose explosively by detonation into nitrous oxide and water vapor. Large stockpiles of the material can be a major fire risk due to their supporting oxidation, and may also detonate, as happened in the Texas City disaster of 1947 which led to major changes in the regulations for storage and handling.

There are two major classes of incidents resulting in explosions:
 In the first case, the explosion happens by the mechanism of shock to detonation transition. The initiation happens by an explosive charge going off in the mass, by the detonation of a shell thrown into the mass, or by detonation of an explosive mixture in contact with the mass. Examples are Kriewald, Morgan, Oppau, Tessenderlo, and Traskwood.
 In the second case, the explosion results from a fire that spreads into the ammonium nitrate (AN) itself (Texas City, Brest, Tianjin, Beirut) or to a mixture of an ammonium nitrate with a combustible material during the fire. The fire must be confined at least to a degree for successful transition from a fire to an explosion (a phenomenon known as "deflagration to detonation transition", or DDT). Pure, compact AN is stable and very difficult to initiate. However, there are numerous cases when even impure AN did not explode in a fire.

Ammonium nitrate decomposes in temperatures above . Pure AN is stable and will stop decomposing once the heat source is removed, but when catalysts are present, the reaction can become self-sustaining (known as self-sustaining decomposition, or SSD). This is a well-known hazard with some types of NPK fertilizers and is responsible for the loss of several cargo ships.

Timeline of major disasters 
The column AN states the amount of ammonium nitrate consumed in the disaster in metric tonnes.

See also 
 ANFO (Ammonium nitrate bomb)
 Largest artificial non-nuclear explosions, many of which involved ammonium nitrate

References 

Nitrates
Explosives
Industrial fires and explosions
Chemical disasters